The California State Guard (CSG) (formerly the California State Military Reserve) is a component of the California National Guard (CNG). The CSG is a volunteer force that supports the state missions and federal readiness of the Army and Air National Guard. CSG service members come from all branches of the military and are citizens with essential skills. Many CSG service members are fully integrated with Army National Guard and Air National Guard units, and are full-time state active duty.

Organization
The California State Guard is authorized under the provisions of the Title 32, United States Code, Section 109(c) and the California State Military Reserve Act (codified in the California Military and Veterans Code). It has legal standing as part of California's Active Militia. Activations are mandatory at times and service members are covered under the Uniformed Services Employment and Reemployment Rights Act (USERRA) as enacted by California state law (7 MVC 394 et. seq. and 566). Employers are required to comply with these laws when service members are called to Emergency State Active Duty (ESAD). Each service member is subject to the Uniform Code of Military Justice (UCMJ) per CMVC § 560.

Members and recruiting
All citizens over the age of 18 and possess a high school diploma or GED may apply for enlistment. Military veterans and those with special skills which materially contribute to the National Guard are of particular interest.

CSG service members are normally considered uncompensated state employees, although when called to Emergency State Active Duty (ESAD), they become compensated at the same rate as their National Guard counterparts. Many CSG service members are full-time State Active Duty (SAD).

Training and qualifications
Training is administered by the Joint Training Command (JTC). The JTC conducts training year round and trains an average of 475 service members per training year.

The JTC provides training, including mission rehearsals, of individuals, units, and staffs using joint service doctrine and tactics, techniques, and procedures (TTPs) to prepare joint forces or joint staffs to respond to strategic, operational, or tactical requirements that are considered necessary to execute their assigned or anticipated missions. All JTC School Houses utilize the Train, Assess, and Counsel method when conducting training.

Any MOS, awards, medals, or badges earned in federal service transfer to the CSG. Depending on rank and time since separation, previous rank also transfers. CSG service members are held to the same regulations and training requirements for promotion as their National Guard counterparts.

All new members must attend the Basic Training Course (BOC). New members without prior military experience must attend Initial Entry Training (IET), a three-month Asynchronous Learning online course where members report to a student learns the fundamentals of the CSG. They are given monthly homework and E-Learning tasks to strengthen their knowledge and train how to interact with the chain of command. Each month new materials are released and students are exposed to another element of becoming a proficient member of their Unit and the CSG. Members are required to maintain physical fitness standards, done on their own time.

Other schools are available to service members who want to promote to their next rank. These include the NCOA (Noncommissioned Officers' Academy), OCS (Officer Candidate School), OTA (Officer Training Academy), and WOTA (Warrant Officer Training Academy). The NCOA has four levels: BLC (Basic Leadership Course: E4–E5), ALC (Advanced Leadership Course: E5–E6), SLC (Senior Leadership Course: E6–E8), and SMA (Sergeants Major Academy: E8–E9). These courses are broken into four or five residential phases at Camp San Luis Obispo. In every course, work is done utilizing a blended learning model (E-Learning and In-person Instruction).

While prior military members retain any Military Occupational Specialty (MOS) previously held, non-prior service members have no MOS qualification. Members with civilian qualifications that meet or exceed standards for a particular MOS are used as Subject Matter Experts (SME) to train their Army/Air Guard counterparts. An example of this is the firearms training team, which is responsible for administering weapons training throughout the California National Guard.

Units

Many CSG service members are fully integrated with Army and Air Guard units. Members of standalone CSG units stay within the CSG's command structure.

Army Component 
The Army Component is the largest section of the organization. Members serve in aligned or standalone units. Aligned units are directly connected to an Army National Guard unit. For example, the 40th Infantry Division of the CA Army National Guard is the CNG parent unit to the CSG's 40th Infantry Division Support Detachment.

Air Component 
The Air Component are service members assigned to Air National Guard units. The Air Component has members stationed around the state including 163rd Attack Wing, 146th Airlift Wing, 129th Rescue Wing, 144th Fighter Wing, and 195th Wing (Cyber).

Maritime Component
On 18 March 2017, the CSG established the Maritime Support Command (MARSCOM) under the command of CAPT M. Hanson, with SCPO E. Anderson as the MARSCOM Senior Enlisted Advisor, in a ceremony aboard the decommissioned WWII-era carrier USS Hornet.

Emergency Response Command 
The Emergency Response Command is the CSG's rapid response force.

Team Shield protects critical infrastructure, military installations and assist civil authorities during times of emergency. Team Shield also works with Team Blaze on fire missions providing access control and assisting local authorities with evacuation orders. Many of its members are also police officers.

Team Blaze responds to wildfires throughout California. Team Blaze works with Cal Fire as a Type 2 Fire Team. These members are activated to prevent, contain, and fight wildfires.

Joint Medical Command
The California State Guard established the Joint Medical Command (JMC) on 18 July 2019. The JMC has the responsibility of overseeing CSG medical personnel as they perform their mission of keeping California’s military and citizens healthy. The JMC provides military leadership to doctors, nurses, surgeons, and technicians.

Legal Support Command 
The Legal Support Command (LSC) is a joint command of the CSG composed of Judge Advocates (JAGs, military attorneys), warrant officer legal administrators, enlisted paralegals, and other personnel in staff and support roles. CSG JAG's provide a full range of legal services to the Army Guard, Air Guard, State Guard, and Youth and Community Programs. CSG JAG's also provide critical legal assistance to service members and their families, which has included protecting deployed service members from civilian job loss, foreclosure, and repossession. JAG's typically work at National Guard armories or installation legal offices throughout the state.

Drills 
Unit Training Assemblies (UTAs, also referred to as "drills") are one weekend each month. Some units require longer drills depending on their mission and aligned units.

Uniforms
CSG service members are authorized the same uniforms as their federal counterparts (Army, Air Force, Navy) with state insignia. Awards from prior military service may be worn. All CSG service members must purchase their uniforms. A yearly $125 uniform allowance is authorized for all service members who maintain 100% drill attendance in a twelve-month period.

CSG service members are eligible for federal and state military awards and may wear previously awarded military awards and decorations. On occasion CSG have been awarded skill badges from other state defense forces, like jump schools, or cyber and drivers course.

Emergency activations 
2020-2022: CSG service members have been activated for the ongoing COVID-19 pandemic. Additional activations occurred for civil unrest, humanitarian aid, and wildfires.

2019: CSG service members were activated to assist with evacuations and rescue operations during high water levels at the Russian River in Guerneville. CSG service members were instrumental in emergency management operations after the Ridgecrest earthquake in July 2019.

2018: CSG service members were activated to assist with evacuations during the Camp Fire in Butte County in 2018.

2017: CSG service members were activated to assist during winter storms resulting in mudslides and flooding, and the Mendocino Complex Fire and the Carr Fire in 2017.

Fire response 
CSG service members are routinely activated for California's wildfire seasons.

A large-scale operation in October/November 2007, over 100 CSG members were activated with their National Guard counterparts to fight wildfires.

The CSG had a vital role in the 2008 "Operation Lightning Strike," when Governor Arnold Schwarzenegger activated over 2,000 troops to help firefighters.

See also
 Military of the United States
 National Guard
 California Military Department
 California National Guard
 California Army National Guard
 California Air National Guard
 California Military Academy

References

External links
 California State Guard Public Website
 Office of the Adjutant General – the Executive Officer and Commander of the California National Guard and California State Military Reserve
 32 U.S.C. § 109
 California Military & Veterans Code
 Index to Militia Units of the State of California 1850-1881

Military in California
State defense forces of the United States
Military units and formations established in 1846
1846 establishments in Alta California